Jeff Teräväinen is a Canadian actor.

Acting career
Teräväinen is best known for his recurring roles on the TV shows Dark Matter as Lieutenant Anders and as Agent Stack on 12 Monkeys. He gained attention as the main bad guy in 2018's The Christmas Chronicles on Netflix. He is also known as the "Voice of the Olympics" for Canadian broadcaster CBC in the 2006 Turino Winter Olympic Games, as well as the 2014 Sochi Winter Olympic Games. In 2014, he was also the "Voice of the 2014 FIFA World Cup" in Canada. Jeff also voiced the Intro to CBC's Hockey Night in Canada for 2 years. Jeff has voiced many characters for best selling video games like Far Cry 5 as Walker and various cult soldiers.  Tom Clancy's Splinter Cell: Blacklist in various roles and Far Cry 2 as Walton Purefoy. In 2019 he was cast as a series regular in the Sci-fi drama Utopia Falls which was released on Hulu February 14, 2020. Jeff received critical acclaim for his portrayal of Gerald. In 2020 Teräväinen voiced Sam Fisher, the protagonist of the Tom Clancy's Splinter Cell series, in Tom Clancy's Rainbow Six Siege.

References

External links

1967 births
Living people
Canadian male film actors
Canadian male television actors
Canadian male video game actors
Canadian male voice actors
Male actors from Oshawa
Canadian people of Finnish descent
21st-century Canadian male actors